Agustín Aragón León (August 28, 1870 – March 30, 1954) was a Mexican politician born in Jonacatepec, Morelos, serving in the Chamber of Deputies. He was also an avid educator and promoter of the positivist ideology in Mexico. He was the founder and editor of the magazine Revista Positiva. His remains were interred at the Panteón de Dolores in Mexico City, in the Rotunda of Illustrious Persons on March 31, 1954.

See also
List of people from Morelos, Mexico

References 

People from Morelos
1870 births
1954 deaths
Members of the Chamber of Deputies (Mexico)